NASCAR on TBS is the name of a former television program that broadcast NASCAR races on the TBS cable network. Select NASCAR Winston Cup Series (now NASCAR Cup Series), Busch Series (now Xfinity Series), and Craftsman Truck Series (now Gander RV & Outdoors Truck Series) races were aired on TBS from its debut in 1983 up to the 2000 season.

Races were switched to TNT in 2001 as part of the then-new NASCAR television deal, although the initial plans were for TBS Superstation to carry the races. Instead, Turner decided that NASCAR would better fit TNT's "We Know Drama" slogan.

Coverage overview
Before the existence of ESPN, live coverage of NASCAR Winston Cup races on television was limited. CBS covered the Daytona 500, the June race at Michigan and the July race at Talladega. ABC usually did the Atlanta race in the spring.

TBS broadcast the Richmond spring race, held the week after Daytona Speedweeks, from 1983 to 1995, as well as the fall races at Rockingham (1985-1987), Atlanta (1983-1985) and Riverside (1982-1987).

For several years in the 1990s, the only Cup Series races aired on TBS were the two races from Charlotte Motor Speedway (Coca-Cola 600 from 1988-2000, UAW-GM Quality 500 from 1989-2000); TBS did not have rights to The Winston, which usually aired on TNN. Also, the channel aired the July race at Pocono Raceway from 1993 to 2000. TBS was also the home of the postseason exhibition races held at Suzuka Circuit and Twin Ring Motegi in Japan from 1996–1998.

The now defunct Prime Network meanwhile, was the first to televise NASCAR Winston Cup qualifying races on a regular basis. The telecasts were mainly for races that would be televised by TBS.

TBS aired side-by-side coverage during commercials during the 2000 UAW-GM Quality 500 in Charlotte.

TBS race schedule

Winston Cup Series

1980s

1983

1984

1985

1986

1987

1988

1989

1990s-2000

1990

1991

1992

1993

1994

1995

1996

1997

1998

1999

2000

Craftsman Truck Series

1996

1997

Commentators
Booth announcers/analysts included Ken Squier, Buddy Baker, and Dick Berggren. After TBS made a host/booth switch, Allen Bestwick became the lap-by-lap announcer with Baker and Berggren in the booth for TBS' 2000 coverage at Lowe's and Pocono.

Lap-by-lap
 Allen Bestwick 
 Ken Squier

Color commentary
 Buddy Baker
 Dick Berggren 
 Geoff Bodine 
 Neil Bonnett 
 Chuck Bown
 Dick Brooks
 Barry Dodson
 Chris Economaki 
 Johnny Hayes
 Ernie Irvan
 Glenn Jarrett
 Dave Marcis 
 Chad Little
 Benny Parsons
 Phil Parsons 
 Richard Petty 
 Greg Sacks
 Lyn St. James
 Ken Stabler
 Kenny Wallace
 Cale Yarborough

Pit road reporters
 Jack Arute
 Dick Berggren
 Steve Byrnes
 Alice Cook 
 Dave Despain
 Chris Economaki 
 Jerry Garrett
 Charlie Harville
 Glenn Jarrett
 Mike Massaro
 Benny Parsons
 Phil Parsons
 Pat Patterson
 Randy Pemberton
 Mark Pfister
 Bob Varsha
 Mike Hogewood
 Jerry Punch
 Mike Wallace
 Joe Whitlock
 Matt Yocum

Studio hosts
Late 1980s broadcasts were known for an infield broadcasting "host" set called "STP Race Central."

 Rick Benjamin 
 Allen Bestwick 
 Dave Despain
 Mike Joy
 Ken Squier

References

External links

TBS (American TV channel) original programming
1990s American television series
1983 American television series debuts
2000 American television series endings
TBS
Turner Sports